Harry "Tony" Leith-Ross (27 January 1886  – 15 March 1973) was a British-American landscape painter and teacher. He taught at the art colonies in Woodstock, New York and Rockport, Maine, and later was part of the art colony in New Hope, Pennsylvania. A precise draftsman and a superb colorist, Leith-Ross is considered one of the Pennsylvania Impressionists.

Life and career
Harry Leith-Ross was born in Saint Pierre, Mauritius – an island in the South Indian Ocean – the son of banker Frederick William Arbuthnot Leith-Ross and Sina van Houten. His mother was the daughter of Dutch politician Samuel van Houten, and his younger brother was Scottish economist Sir Frederick Leith-Ross.

Leith-Ross was educated in England and Scotland, and studied engineering at the University of Birmingham for a year. He emigrated to the United States at age 17 in 1903, and worked for his uncle's coal company. He subsequently took up advertising work in Denver, Colorado. He travelled to Paris in 1909, and studied art at the Académie Delécluse and the Académie Julian. He studied in New York City at the National Academy of Design School under Charles Yardley Turner, beginning in 1910.

The Art Students League of New York operated a summer painting school in Woodstock, New York, which Leith-Ross first attended in 1913. His instructors included Birge Harrison and John F. Carlson. It was there that he met fellow student John Fulton Folinsbee, who would become his life-long friend. Folinsbee had contracted polio as a child, and was confined to a wheelchair. The two men shared a cabin, and Leith-Ross would carry Folinsbee around the countryside on his back. Each served as best man for the other's wedding. Folinsbee married in 1914, and he and his wife settled in New Hope, Pennsylvania in 1916, where Leith-Ross was a frequent houseguest. Both men painted en plein air, directly from nature. They were famous for spending afternoons sketching on the bridge at New Hope (and for tossing anything that displeased them into the Delaware River).

Leith-Ross served as a second lieutenant in the United States Army during World War I.

After the war, Leith-Ross taught at the University of Buffalo, and co-founded an art school in Rockport, Maine, where he taught during the summers. He met student Emily Slaymaker in Summer 1925, and they were married later that year. They lived in Woodstock, New York for a decade, then settled outside New Hope, Pennsylvania in 1935. They had one daughter, Elizabeth Leith-Ross Mow.

He wrote a well-regarded book on landscape painting: 

Leith-Ross died in 1973 in Pineville, Pennsylvania.

Exhibitions, awards and honors
Leith-Ross and Folinsbee had a joint exhibition at the Toledo Museum of Art in November 1915. Leith-Ross exhibited oil and watercolor paintings at the National Academy of Design in the 1910s, and at the Art Institute of Chicago in the 1920s. He exhibited at the Pennsylvania Academy of the Fine Arts most years from 1916 to 1952, and won prizes from the Salmagundi Club and the American Watercolor Society. 

Leith-Ross was elected an Associate of the National Academy of Design in 1928, and Folinsbee painted his diploma portrait. Leith-Ross appeared in at least three other paintings by Folinsbee.

Legacy
Leith-Ross expressed his philosophy about painting in The Landscape Painter's Manual (1956), Watson Guptill Publications. 

His works are in the permanent collections of the James A. Michener Art Museum, the Woodmere Art Museum, the Smithsonian American Art Museum, and many private collections.

Leith-Ross's papers are at the University of Pennsylvania.

The Michener Museum hosted a posthumous exhibition of his works, Poetry in Design: The Art of Harry Leith-Ross (October 2006 - March 2007).

Leith-Ross's Connecticut Valley in Fall was appraised on Antiques Roadshow in 2017.

Selected works
 Sunlight on Snow (1927), Thomas Colville Fine Art, Guilford, Connecticut
 Lone Skater (1943), Woodmere Art Museum, Philadelphia, Pennsylvania
 Flag Station (1945), Pennsylvania Academy of the Fine Arts, Philadelphia, Pennsylvania
 The Sleigh (1945), private collection
 Soldier's Grave (1948), private collection
 Demolition (1954), Smithsonian American Art Museum, Washington, D.C.
 The Fair (1958), Woodmere Art Museum, Philadelphia, Pennsylvania
 Red Barn (undated), James A. Michener Art Museum, Doylestown, Pennsylvania
 Canal Dwellers (undated), Woodmere Art Museum, Philadelphia, Pennsylvania

References

1886 births
1973 deaths
British people of Dutch descent
British emigrants to the United States
People from Bucks County, Pennsylvania
People from New Hope, Pennsylvania
Alumni of the University of Birmingham
Académie Julian alumni
Scottish male painters
British male painters
British landscape painters
Pennsylvania Impressionism
University at Buffalo faculty
National Academy of Design associates
Académie Delécluse alumni